Lignereuil is a commune in the Pas-de-Calais department in the Hauts-de-France region of France.

Geography

Population

Places of interest

 The church of St. Martin, dating from the fifteenth century.
 The seventeenth-century chateau.
 A double avenue of lime trees, planted in 1850, over a mile (2 km) long, from the chateau to that of Givenchy-le-Noble.

See also
 Communes of the Pas-de-Calais department

References

Communes of Pas-de-Calais